The men's 200 metres event at the 1975 Summer Universiade was held at the Stadio Olimpico in Rome on 20 and  21 September.

Medalists

Results

Heats
Held on 20 September

Wind:Heat 5: -1.4 m/s, Heat 6: +1.0 m/s

Semifinals
Held on 21 September

Wind:Heat 1: 0.0 m/s, Heat 2: ? m/s

Final
Held on 21 September

Wind: 0.0 m/s

References

Athletics at the 1975 Summer Universiade
1975